Skræling (Old Norse and Icelandic: skrælingi, plural skrælingjar) is the name the Norse Greenlanders used for the peoples they encountered in North America (Canada and Greenland). In surviving sources, it is first applied to the Thule people, the proto-Inuit group with whom the Norse coexisted in Greenland after about the 13th century. In the sagas, it is also used for the peoples of the region known as Vinland whom the Norse encountered and fought during their expeditions there in the early 11th century.

Etymology
The word is most likely related to the Old Norse word , meaning "dried skin", in reference to the animal pelts worn by the Inuit. William Thalbitzer (1932: 14) speculated that  might have been derived from the Old Norse verb , meaning "bawl, shout, or yell". In modern Icelandic,  means "barbarian", whereas the Danish descendant, means "weakling".

By the time these sources were recorded,  was the common term Norse Greenlanders used for the Thule people, the ancestors to the modern Inuit. The Thule first arrived in Greenland from the North American mainland in the 13th century and were thereafter in contact with the Greenlanders. The Greenlanders' Saga and the Saga of Erik the Red, which were written in the 13th century, use this same term for the people of the area known as Vinland whom the Norse met in the early 11th century. The word subsequently became well known, and has been used in the English language since the 18th century.

"Kalaallit", the name of the largest ethnic group of Greenlandic Inuit, is probably derived from skræling. In 1750, Paul Egede mentions that the Inuit used "Inuit" among themselves, but used Kalaalit when speaking to non-Inuit, stating that this was the term used by Norse settlers.

Norse exploration of the New World

Norse exploration of the New World began with the initial sighting of North America by an Icelander named Bjarni Herjólfsson, who spotted land after drifting off course on a journey to Greenland in 985 or 986. 

His voyage piqued the interest of later explorers including Leif Eriksson, who would explore and name the areas of Helluland, Markland and Vinland.

First contact 

Leif laid the groundwork for later colonizing efforts by establishing a foothold on Vinland, where he constructed some "large houses." Upon his return to Greenland,

Thorvald has the first contact with the native population which would come to be known as the skrælings. After capturing and killing eight of the natives, they were attacked beside their beached ships, which they defended:

Thorfinn Karlsefni 

Thorfinn Karlsefni was the first Norse explorer to attempt to truly colonize the newly discovered Vinland, on the same site as his predecessors Thorvald and Leif Eriksson.  According to the Saga of Erik the Red, he set sail with three ships and 140 men.

Upon reaching Vinland, their intended destination, they found the now famous grapes and self-sown wheat for which the land was named. They spent a very hard winter at this site, barely surviving by fishing, hunting game inland, and gathering eggs on the island. The following summer they sailed to the island of Hop where they had the first peaceful interactions with the native people, with whom they traded. Thorfinn forbade his men to trade their swords and spears, so they mainly exchanged red cloth for pelts. They described the aboriginal inhabitants:

Shortly thereafter, the Norsemen were attacked by natives frightened by a bull that broke loose from the Norse encampment. They were forced to retreat to a more defensible location before engaging their attackers; at the end of the battle two of his men had been slain, while "many of the natives" were killed. As with any inhabited foreign land, Thorfinn and his men realized that

After this adventure, they returned to Greenland. Their three-year excursion would be the longest lasting known European colony in the New World, until Columbus's voyages nearly 500 years later initiated full-scale European conquest of the Americas.

Inuit folktales of the Norse
There are also accounts from the Inuit:

Kavdlunait (plural) was the Inuit word for foreigner or European. Compare modern Greenlandic qallunaaq ("Dane"), formerly spelled ĸavdlunâĸ.

See also
Skraeling Island

References

Hans Christian Gulløv, ed., Grønlands Forhistorie,  Copenhagen: Gyldendal, 2005. 
Magnus Magnusson and Hermann Pálsson (Translators), The Vinland Sagas : The Norse Discovery of America, Penguin Books, 1965 Translation, 13th reprint of 1985, p. 65,  
Kane, Njord (2015) The Vikings: The Story of a People (Spangenhelm Publishing)

Further reading
"Skraeling: First Peoples of Helluland, Markland, and Vinland.” Odess, Daniel; Stephen Loring; and William W. Fitzhugh, in Vikings: The North Atlantic Saga. Fitzhugh, William W. and Elisabeth I. Ward, editors. Washington, DC: Smithsonian Institution, 2000. Pages 193–205. .
"The Viking discovery of America: the excavation of a Norse settlement in L'Anse aux Meadows, Newfoundland." Ingstad Helge. Checkmark Books. New York, 2001. .
Kane, Njord (2015) The Vikings: The Story of a People (Spangenhelm Publishing) 
http://blogmeridian.blogspot.com/2008/08/unknowing-world.html
http://www.newadvent.org/cathen/01416a.htm
"Norse contact with Native Americans before the Viking Age" by Njord Kane, 2016 * http://spangenhelm.com/norse-contact-native-americans-viking-age/

External links
 Online etymology dictionary
 Native Languages of the Americas

Indigenous peoples of North America
Norse colonization of North America
Ethno-cultural designations
Exonyms